Marginal Pinheiros (officially SP-015) is a section of the highway that runs through the city of São Paulo, Brazil along the Pinheiros River. It is one of the most important roads in São Paulo, linking the north and south zones, though this east - west connection, beginning at the triple border of Campos Grande, Cidade Dutra and Socorro and ending at the border of Vila Leopoldina and Jaguaré.

It provides access to many important highways of the state of São Paulo, including the Anchieta Highway and the Imigrantes Highway via the Bandeirantes Avenue, the Raposo Tavares Highway and the Régis Bittencourt Highway via the Francisco Morato Avenue, and to the Castelo Branco highway via the Cebolão, a complex of accesses linking Marginal Pinheiros, Marginal Tietê and the aforementioned highway. There are several bridges connecting each side of the river, such as the Octavio Frias de Oliveira bridge. Even though there are seven lanes on each side of the Marginal Pinheiros, in which 5 lanes are express to up 90 km/h and a local one with 3 lanes to up 60 km/h, it is still very common for traffic congestion to take place there. A CPTM Train line runs along both the river and the road.

Streets in São Paulo
Highways in São Paulo (state)